Vicki, Kelly and Amanda Wilson, generally known as The Wilson Sisters, are three New Zealanders from Northland.

Background
The Wilson Sisters are known in equestrian circles for helping to tame wild Kaimanawa horses, to avoid them having to be culled when the herd exceeds sustainable management numbers. They have competed in the highest level of jumping for many years. They produced the popular Keeping up with the Kaimanawas show about their activities, which was seen by over 500,000 viewers.

Works and other information
Kelly has a pet horse called Bounce.
Kelly Wilson has been raising money for spinal cord injuries.

References

External links 
Wilson Sisters – Official website

New Zealand Christians
New Zealand female equestrians
New Zealand producers
New Zealand writers
Living people
Sisters
Year of birth missing (living people)